Mfantsipim is an all-boys boarding secondary school  in Cape Coast, Ghana, established by the Methodist Church in 1876 to foster intellectual, moral, and spiritual growth on the then Gold Coast. Its founding name was Wesleyan High School and the first headmaster was James Picot, a French scholar, who was only 18 years old on his appointment. 

After changing its name to Wesleyan Collegiate School and Richmond College, the school, in 1905, merged with another Cape-Coast-based public high school established by John Mensah Sarbah (an old student of Wesley High School), who had established his own school called "Mfantsipim" as a rival of the Methodist-run school. 

John Mensah Sarbah died five years after the merger, at the age of 46, leaving the school wholly in the hands of the Methodist Church. 

Mfantsipim is nicknamed "The School" because it gave birth to other prominent schools such as Prempeh College. Other schools, such as Ghana National College, were started with students from Mfantsipim. Schools established under the Mfantsipim blueprint include Achimota School, Mawuli School and Ghana Secondary Technical School. Mfantsipim trainers also started Wesley Girls High School, the nation's most prominent all-female second cycle institution.

Mfantsipim, since Ghana's independence in 1957, has produced 3 Bank of Ghana Governors, 3 Vice Presidents, and 1 Head of State.

History

The idea of establishing a collegiate school to raise  educational standards in the Gold Coast was first mooted in 1865 but was not realized until 1876 when the Wesleyan High School was established in Cape Coast with donations from local businessmen and the support of the Methodist Missionary Society in London.

The school was established to train teachers and began with 17 pupils. It was originally planned to be sited in Accra because the British Government had, by 1870, decided to move the capital of the Gold Coast from Cape Coast to Accra. However, local agitation and the urgent need to put the idea into practice after eleven years of debate pressurised the government to allow the school to begin functioning, but on the understanding that it would later be moved to Accra, though no such move ever took place.

The founding name of Mfantsipim was Wesleyan High School and it was established on 3 April 1876. In 1905 a graduate of the school, John Mensah Sarbah, founded a rival school named Mfantsipim; the name derives from "Mfantsefo-apem", literally meaning "thousands of Fantes" but actually meaning "the gathering of hosts of scholars for change" originally by the Fantes. In July of the same year, the two schools were merged under the supervision of the Methodist Church, keeping the name Mfantsipim. John Mensah-Sarbah, who came up with the name "Mfantsipim" stated at the opening of the school that its aim was "to train up God-fearing, respectable, and intelligent lads."

The school was deemed to be a grammar school because Latin and Greek were taught there in the beginning, though it also offered other disciplines such as carpentry, art and crafts. It is an all-boys boarding school with seven dormitories or houses.

The Reverend W. T. Balmer arrived at Mfantsipim in 1907 on a mission to inspect the states of colleges and collegiates around West Africa at the time. On his arrival at Mfantsipim it seemed, for some reason, he had to stay. To his surprise, he only met eight boys in the entire school, with neither a teacher nor a headmaster, the then headmaster having left for the United Kingdom. Balmer named them the "Faithful Eight". One of those boys was Kobina Sekyi, who went on to become a renowned lawyer, statesman, and writer. A monument has been erected in-between the Administration Block and the Assembly Hall to perpetuate their memory.

Reverend R. A. Lockhart arrived in 1925 and laid a solid foundation for the progress of the school. 
He built classrooms and dormitories on the Kwabotwe Hill and finally brought the school to the present site in 1931. He was also the main architect in bringing the Cambridge School Leaving Certificate Examination into the Gold Coast (now Ghana).

Lockhart was a robust, stronghearted and principled Irishman and was critical of Gordon Guggisberg's administration and ideas about secondary education in the Gold Coast. Guggisberg had proposed to reduce the school to a basic institution, but Lockhart convinced local people to enroll more of their wards.

Lockhart's administration oversaw the construction of most of the buildings and structures in the school. He encouraged some of the bright students of the school to become teachers, on their graduation. For example, he mentored F. L. Bartels in this direction, and through this effort, Mfantsipim finally got its first ever black headmaster.

It is said that the Reverend Lockhart was a firm believer in the spirit of the black man and his abilities thereof. Asked of Bartels in France in his later years which three headmasters besides himself, were Mfantsipim's greatest, he responded: "I will give you only two – Balmer and Lockhart; you add the third."

Dr. Francis Lodwic Bartels, the first black headmaster of the school and also the school's very own product, came into office in 1949. He went from acting headmaster from 1942 to 1945, to becoming main headmaster, and serving for another 11 years, ending his service in 1961.

One notable thing about Dr. Bartels was the close relationship he kept with the boys, encouraging them to face the world, but only with discipline. Kofi Annan, former United Nations secretary general, also an alumnus of the school, recalled: "I was one of a group of boys who sat on the floor of his office for our weekly lesson in spoken English."

There have been many influential products of the school who have served, not only the country and the continent of Africa, but also continents outside Africa and many international bodies. Mfantsipim School has trained many alumni in the fields of medicine, science, engineering, education, architecture, and many other disciplines.

In 1931 the school moved to its present location on the Kwabotwe Hill in the northern part of Cape Coast on the Kotokuraba road. The school sometimes has been referred to as Kwabotwe or simply Botwe for the reason for it being on that hill.

Headmasters

Alumni

Alumni of the school include Kofi Annan, 2001 Nobel Peace Prize laureate and former Secretary-General of the United Nations; Kofi Abrefa Busia, former Prime Minister of Ghana; Kobina Sekyi, lawyer, writer, nationalist; J. E. Casely Hayford, journalist and politician; and Alex Quaison-Sackey, diplomat, first black president of the UN General Assembly; Joseph W.S. de Graft-Johnson, former Vice President of Ghana, Kow Nkensen Arkaah, former Vice President of the Republic of Ghana; Paa Kwesi Amissah-Arthur, former Vice President of Ghana; Mohamed Ibn Chambas, former president of ECOWAS commission; Kobina Arku Korsah, first Chief Justice of Ghana

Awards
Winners of the 1999 and 2014 editions of the National Science and Maths Quiz 
Winners of 2011, 2012, 2013, 2015 and 2018 Sprite Ball Championship

References

External links
Mfantsipim School, Ghana
Mfantsipim Regimental Band - Trooping the Colour
Mfantsipim School Choir

Cape Coast
Educational institutions established in 1876
Boarding schools in Ghana
High schools in Ghana
1876 establishments in Gold Coast (British colony)
Mfantsipim School alumni
Christian schools in Ghana